Pseudoblabes oophora is a moth in the subfamily Arctiinae. It was described by Philipp Christoph Zeller in 1853. It is found in Assam in India, Sri Lanka, Myanmar, on Java and in Singapore.

Description
In the male, the head and thorax are yellowish white. Forewings dark greyish, whereas basal, costal, outer areas yellowish white. The costal band expanding into a patch at the center. Hindwings ochreous. Marginal area slightly suffused with fuscous. In female, hindwings are fuscous with yellow cilia.

References

Moths described in 1853
Cisthenina